Notte prima degli esami – Oggi is a 2007 Italian comedy film directed by Fausto Brizzi.

The film is a sequel/remake to 2006 Notte prima degli esami.

Cast

References

External links

2007 films
Films directed by Fausto Brizzi
Films produced by Fulvio Lucisano
Films scored by Bruno Zambrini
2000s Italian-language films
2007 comedy films
Italian comedy films
2000s Italian films